Carn Fadryn, sometimes Carn Fadrun or Garn Fadryn, is a five-hectare Iron Age hillfort and is the name of the mountain on which the fort is situated. It lies in the centre of the Llŷn Peninsula, Gwynedd, and overlooks the village of Garnfadryn, Wales.

There seems to be two phases of ancient hillfort building on Carn Fadryn, followed by a medieval fortification of the summit.

This second period of reinforcement dates from about 100 BC.

The third fort which strengthens the natural crag near the summit is thought to be "the castle of the sons of Owain", mentioned in 1188 as being newly built. (Giraldi Cambrensis Opera (Rolls series, 1868), VI, p123 'dua castra lapidea de nova sita fuerunt; unum...Deutrait; alterum...in capite Lhein, quod erat filium Oenei, cui nomen Karnmadrun.')

On a clear day, the view from Garn Fadryn takes in Anglesey, Snowdonia, most of Cardigan Bay and even the Wicklow Mountains in Ireland.

See also
List of hillforts in Wales

References

External links 
 Information site for Garnfadryn Llŷn - Safle am Garnfadryn
 www.geograph.co.uk : photos of Carn Fadryn and surrounding area

Buildings and structures in Gwynedd
Archaeological sites in Gwynedd
Marilyns of Wales
Tourism in Gwynedd
Tudweiliog
Mountains and hills of Gwynedd